Pierre Senges (born 1968, Romans-sur-Isère) is a French writer. His work includes nineteen books, numerous essays published in literary journals, and over seventy plays for radio.

His books are sometimes noted for having a baroque prose style. They frequently combine erudition, intertextuality, and invention (Fragments of Lichtenberg, The Major Refutation) or play on the relation between historically true and fictional elements (Les carnets de Gordon McGuffin and Essais fragiles d’aplomb). About five of Senges's books have been translated and published in English, including Fragments of Lichtenberg, Ahab (Sequels), The Major Refutation, Geometry in the Dust, and Studies of Silhouettes.

Senges' radio plays (fictions radiophoniques) have been produced by France Culture and France Inter. He has been the recipient of the following prizes: the Prix Wepler, the Prix SACD Nouveau Talent Radio in 2007, the Grand prix de la fiction radiophonique de la SGDL in 2008, the Prix du deuxième roman, the Prix Rhône-Alpes, and the Prix meilleure page 111.

Works

Books 
 Veuves au maquillage, Éditions Verticales, 2000 ; Points Seuil. Prix Rhône-Alpes
 Essais fragiles d’aplomb (essay), Verticales, coll. Minimales, 2002
 Ruines-de-Rome, Verticales, 2002 ; Points Seuil. Prix du deuxième roman 2003
 La réfutation majeure : version française, d'après Réfutatio major, attribué à Antonio de Guevara (1480-1548), Verticales, 2004, (Gallimard, Folio 4647, 2007)
 The Major Refutation: English version of Refutatio major, attributed to Antonio de Guevara (1480–1545), translated by Jacob Siefring, Contra Mundum Press, Dec 2016
 Géométrie dans la poussière, illustrations by Patrice Killoffer, Verticales, 2004
 Geometry in the Dust, illustrations by Patrice Killoffer, translated by Jacob Siefring, Inside the Castle, Apr 2019
 L’idiot et les hommes de paroles (essai), Bayard, 2005
 Sort l'assassin, entre le spectre, Verticales, 2006
 Fragments de Lichtenberg, Verticales, 2008
 Fragments of Lichtenberg, translated by Gregory Flanders, Dalkey Archive Press, Jan 2017
 Les carnets de Gordon McGuffin, illustrated by Nicolas de Crécy, Futuropolis, 2008.
 Les aventures de Percival : un conte phylogénétique, illustrated by Nicolas de Crécy, Dis voir, 2009
 The Adventures of Percival: A Phylogenetic Tale, translated by Paul Buck and Catherine Petit, Dis voir, 2009
 Etudes de silhouettes, Verticales, March 2010
 Studies of Silhouettes, trans. Jacob Siefring, Sublunary Editions, Nov 2020
 Environs et mesures, Gallimard, « Le Cabinet des lettrés », April 2011
 Zoophile contant fleurette, Cadex, April 2012
 Achab (séquelles), Verticales, August 2015
 Ahab (Sequels), trans. Jacob Siefring & Tegan Raleigh, Contra Mundum, Nov 2021
 Cendres des hommes et des bulletins, illustrated by Sergio Aquindo, Le Tripode, September 2016
 Projectiles au sens propre, Verticales, January 2020
 Rabelais's Doughnuts: Selected Short Writings, trans. Jacob Siefring, Sublunary Editions, February 2022
 Épître aux wisigoths, Éditions José Corti, 2023
 Un long silence interrompu par le cri d'un griffon, Verticales, 2023

Selected Radio Plays 
 Un immense fil d’une heure de temps, directed by Marguerie Gateau, 2007
 Histoire de Bouvard et Pécuchet, copistes, adaption of the book by Gustave Flaubert, with Dominique Pinon and Philippe Magnan, directed by Jean-Matthieu Zahnd, 2009
 Proxima du Centaure (Radio fiction pamphlet), Lansman, March 2010
 Les Évasions de Boris Anacrouse, directed by Alexandre Plank, 2010
 Rumeurs autour d'une Encyclopédie du silence, directed by Laure Egoroff, 2012
 Le Discret et le Continu, directed by Jean-Matthieu Zahnd, 2016
 La Maison Winchester, directed by Jean-Matthieu Zahnd, 2017
 Comment faire disparaître une ombre, directed by Jean-Matthieu Zahnd, 2019

References

External links 
 Author page at Editions Verticales
 Pierre Senges discussed at remue.net
 Audio recording of interview with Laurent Demanze 
 Review of Ruines-de-Rome by the magazine Lire
 Review of Fragments de Lichtenberg by Matricule des Anges
 Translated excerpt from Geometry in the Dust

21st-century French dramatists and playwrights
21st-century French essayists
People from Drôme
1968 births
Living people
French male dramatists and playwrights
21st-century French male writers
French male non-fiction writers